Causeway Bay is a station on the MTR network on Hong Kong Island, Hong Kong. It serves the locality of East Point within Wan Chai District.

History
In 1967, Freeman Fox and Wilbur Smith Associates released the government-commissioned Mass Transport Study, which proposed a new underground railway. The government gave approval on the 95-million-dollar construction of the line on 23 December 1980 and work started in October 1982. In 1984, the station construction site was sold by MTR to Taisei Corporation for $380m, now the location of Sogo Hong Kong.

Services
The typical off-peak service is 17 trains per hour in both directions, which is a train every 3–6 minutes.

Station layout
The platforms of Causeway Bay station are constructed in a stacked arrangement, with platform 1 above platform 2.

Entrances/exits
Causeway Bay is a primary shopping district in Hong Kong with exits from the MTR leading directly into major outlets such as Sogo and Times Square, which can be accessed through a long, upward sloping pedestrian walkway at Exit A.

Unlike other MTR stations, there are three different concourses in Causeway Bay station. After exiting the paid areas through the turnstiles, the other two concourses are inaccessible underground. The west and east concourses were opened on 31 May 1985 with the opening of the station, while the south concourse and Exit A were opened in 1994 with the opening of Times Square.

South concourse
In the basement of Times Square:
A: Times Square

West concourse
In the basement of Causeway Bay Plaza (Phase 1):
B: Causeway Bay Plaza
C: Sino Plaza

East concourse
In the basement of Sogo Department Store:
D1/D2/D3/D4: Sogo Department Store
E: Victoria Park
F1: Jardine's Crescent
F2: Hysan Place

Transport connections

Bus routes
These are the bus routes found in the vicinity of Causeway Bay station that provide connections with other areas not served by the MTR including Aberdeen/Wah Kwai Estate, Braemar Hill, Happy Valley, Jardine's Lookout, Kennedy Town, Lai Tak Tsuen, Lei Tung Estate, Park Road, Sham Wan/Wong Chuk Hang, Nam Cheong station/Hoi Lai Estate, South Horizons, The Peak, Tin Wan, Tsing Yi/Cheung On, Wah Fu.

Hong Kong Tramways
Hong Kong Island's tramway system consists of an inner loop branching out at Causeway Bay towards Happy Valley. The nearest tram stop is located along Percival Street near the end of Matheson Street.

Plans to expand Causeway Bay station

In November 2006, MTR announced they would build an underground shopping mall and expand the current Causeway Bay station. The station will add 5 new exits: 
E1: East Point Road
E2: Great George Street at Hong Kong Building
F1: Former Hennessy Centre
F2: Yee Wo Street at McDonald's Building
F3: Paterson Street
and the current Exit E (Great George Street next to The Body Shop) will be removed. The plan also triples the current station size.

Gallery

Notes

References

External links
 

Causeway Bay
East Point, Hong Kong
MTR stations on Hong Kong Island
Island line (MTR)
Railway stations in Hong Kong opened in 1985
1985 establishments in Hong Kong